Juhani Rahikainen (born 26 June 1944) is a Finnish gymnast. He competed in eight events at the 1968 Summer Olympics.

References

External links
 

1944 births
Living people
Finnish male artistic gymnasts
Olympic gymnasts of Finland
Gymnasts at the 1968 Summer Olympics
People from Mikkeli
Sportspeople from South Savo
20th-century Finnish people